Clyde Foster (November 21, 1931 – March 6, 2017) was an American scientist and mathematician. He worked for the Army Ballistic Missile Agency and then for NASA, and from 1975 to 1986 was the head of Equal Employment Opportunity at Marshall Space Flight Center in Huntsville, Alabama. He is credited with setting up training programs that allowed hundreds of African Americans to get the training necessary for positions and promotions at NASA in Huntsville, when Alabama was segregated and African Americans were denied those opportunities. To that purpose he also helped found a Computer Science program at his alma mater, Alabama A&M University, a historically black university, where he headed the Computer Science program while on loan from NASA. In 1981 he was awarded the Philip A. Hart Award for his "significant contribution toward improving urban and working environments".

Foster was also a community activist, and helped revive Triana, Alabama, a small majority-African American community near Huntsville; he was instrumental in the community regaining its charter, was a plaintiff in lawsuits filed over DDT pollution in Triana, and for two decades served as its mayor.

Biography
Clyde Foster was born in Birmingham, Alabama, on November 21, 1931, as the sixth child of twelve. He attended A. H. Parker High School, and the experience of living as an African American in segregated Birmingham made him realize he needed to get away; for that reason he attended Alabama A&M University (a historically black university in the north of the state), where he received his BS degree in Mathematics and Chemistry in 1954. After serving two years in the United States Army, he moved to Selma, Alabama, and worked as a science teacher in Dallas County, Alabama, from 1956 to 1957.

Foster left Selma and became a mathematician technician at the Army Ballistic Missile Agency, at Redstone Arsenal in Huntsville, Alabama, as part of a team that did calculations for rockets. ABMA became part of NASA in 1958, and in 1960, he and a group of colleagues were transferred to NASA's Marshall Space Flight Center, which had just been founded. He was assigned a position as a mathematician and instructor in the Computation Laboratory. Around that time Foster was considering leaving, but President John F. Kennedy's announcement that the new administration would charge NASA to go to the Moon made him stay. Foster worked regularly as a recruiter, trying to attract black workers to Marshall. The problem, both for hiring new workers and promoting current workers at NASA, was that training was required, and while NASA itself, as a federal entity, did not segregate, its location in a segregated state meant that employees and future employees who were African-American could not attend the kinds of training programs they needed in order to be hired or promoted, since those were held in public facilities, which were segregated (such as ballrooms of hotels that allowed whites only).

Soon after he joined NASA he was asked to train a white colleague to become his boss, at a time when the Civil Rights Movement in Alabama was demanding change. Foster complained to his boss and refused the assignment, and then demanded that NASA start a program to train black workers. In the end, NASA agreed and started a training program in collaboration with Alabama A&M University. That the program in a way continued segregation was of secondary concern to Foster. At the end of the 1960s he persuaded Wernher von Braun, who had worked in Nazi Germany's rocket development program and later headed the Marshall Center, to support him in setting up a Computer Science program at Alabama A&M. The university initially was not interested, being more focused on more traditional training in nursing, education, and farming, besides civil engineering. Foster persisted, and in 1968 he became the director of Alabama A&M's Computer Science Department (until 1970), and established the program's undergraduate degree; NASA paid his salary for those two years.

In 1972, Foster joined the Equal Opportunity Office at Marshall, as a staff officer, and in 1975 he became the office's director. His job was to ensure that all the Center's operations and its contractors provided equal opportunity. He retired in 1986. In this capacity, and through the establishment of training programs, he helped hundreds of African-Americans become employed by NASA.

Foster died on March 6, 2017.

Other activities
Foster was mayor of Triana, Alabama, a settlement of less than a hundred African-American families near Huntsville. The town had collapsed after the re-routing of a railroad to bypass it. Foster came to know the community after he met his future wife Dorothy in college; she lived in Triana, and he moved there after coming to work for NASA. Eight years after moving there, he managed to sway a probate judge to revive the municipality, having discovered that its municipal charter had never actually been dissolved and that Alabama law allowed such still-chartered municipalities to be revived. The judge subsequently named Foster mayor, and appointed a city council. A feature article in Ebony credited Foster with reviving the town, which he hoped would share in the development book prompted in part by NASA. He was mayor for twenty years, from 1964 until September 1984. He also served on the state's Commission on Higher Education, on an appointment made in 1974 by Alabama Governor George C. Wallace.

With his to-be life-long friends Alonzo Toney and George Malone, in 1972 he co-founded Triana Industries, an electronics manufacturer with himself as president and 28 employees.
Toney was the company vice-president and also the operations manager of the Alabama A&M Computer Services Center, and in 1984 later succeeded Foster as mayor of Triana.
Malone was the general manager of Triana Industries.

In 1981 Foster was awarded the Philip A. Hart Award for his "significant contribution toward improving urban and working environments". He was one of the plaintiffs in the 1980s lawsuits filed against Olin Corporation over DDT pollution in Triana.

References

Reference bibliography

 
 

Further reading
 
 
 
 

External links
"Race and the Space Race", including interview with Clyde Foster

1931 births
2017 deaths
African-American academics
African-American mathematicians
African-American mayors in Alabama
African-American United States Army personnel
Alabama A&M University alumni
Alabama A&M University faculty
Mathematicians from Alabama
Mayors of places in Alabama
Military personnel from Birmingham, Alabama
NASA people
People from Huntsville, Alabama
Politicians from Birmingham, Alabama
20th-century African-American people
21st-century African-American people